Eugène Laermans (born 8 May 1910, date of death unknown) was a Belgian sabre fencer. He competed at the 1936 and 1948 Summer Olympics.

References

External links
 

1910 births
Year of death missing
People from Tienen
Belgian male sabre fencers
Olympic fencers of Belgium
Fencers at the 1936 Summer Olympics
Fencers at the 1948 Summer Olympics
Sportspeople from Flemish Brabant